was a Japanese film director. He is well known for directing the Zatoichi and Nemuri Kyōshirō film series.

Biography
Tanaka graduated from Kwansei Gakuin University. In 1948, he joined the Daiei studio and started working as an assistant director under Kon Ichikawa, Kenji Mizoguchi and Kazuo Mori etc. In 1958, Tanaka was promoted to director and debuted with Bakeneko Goyōda. Tanaka received the Japan Directors Guild Special award for his Akumyō series films. In 1971, he was released from his contract with Daiei and become a freelance director when the studio shut down film production.  As a freelance director he directed a lot of jidaigeki television dramas such as Hissatsu series.

His final work was in the 2007 short film Shonen Kawachiondotori Monogatari.
In December 2007, he died of Intracranial hemorrhage.

Selected filmography

Television
 Ronin of the Wilderness (1972-74)
 Nemuri Kyōshirō(1972) (ep.2,4,13,14,19 and 20)
 Hissatsu Shiokinin (1973) (ep.20)
 Tasukenin Hashiru (1973-74) (ep.18,19,23,24,28,31 and 34)
 Kurayami Shitomenin (1974) (ep.5,6,15 and 20)
 Kenkaku Shōbai (ep.2,4,12 and 13)
 Amigasa Jūbei (1974-75) (ep.1,2,16,17 and 18)
 Nagasaki Hangachōu (1975) (ep.9,10 and 16)
 Hissatsu Shiokiya Kagyō (1975) (ep.24)
 Zatoichi  (1974-78) Season One Episode 6,7,and 10 (1974) S2 Episode 9, 12 (1976) S4 Episode 20 (1979) 
 Akō Rōshi (1979) (ep.3,4,9,10 and 11)
 Hissatsu Shigotonin (1979-81) (ep.19,21,28, 42,43,47,48,52,53,58,59,66,69,70,75,77 and 80)
 Shin Hissatsu Shigotonin (1981-82) (ep.3,9,10,14,15,20,29,30,35,37,43,47,52 and 53)
 Hissatsu Shigotonin III (1982-83) (ep.1,3,6,12,16,24,25 and 32)
 Hissatsu Watashinin (1983) (ep.1,2 and 6)
 Hissatsu Shigotonin IV (1983-84) (ep.1,2,4,8,9,15,21,29,32 and 38)
 Hissatsu Shikirinin (1984) (ep.13 and 15)
 Hissatsu Shigotonin V (1985) (ep.3,6 and 11)
 Hissatsu Shigotonin V Gekitouhen (ep.5)
 Hissatsu Shigotonin V Senpuhen (1986-87) (ep. 3,6 and 9)
 Nemuri Kyōshirō (1989) (TV Movie)
 Abare Hasshū Goyō Tabi (1990-91) (Season1, ep.1,3 and 6), (Season2, ep.10,12,22 and 23)

References

External links

1920 births
2007 deaths
People from Osaka
Japanese film directors
Samurai film directors
Yakuza film directors